is a Japanese actress who has appeared in about 100 films and many TV productions. She is married to film director Masahiro Shinoda, in whose films she has frequently appeared. She won the award for best actress at the 2nd Hochi Film Award for her performance in Shinoda's Ballad of Orin.

Heritage
Iwashita was born in Tokyo, Japan. Her father was the actor and film producer Kiyoshi Nonomura （野々村潔）(1914-2003). Her maternal aunt Shizue Yamagishi （山岸しづ江）was married to the kabuki actor Kawarasaki Chōjūrō IV （四代目　河原崎長十郎）(1902-1981), who starred in Sadao Yamanaka's 1937 Humanity and Paper Balloons, one of the most influential early Japanese talkies, and was one of the founders in 1931 of the Zenshinza Theatre Company （劇団前進座）.

Education
After attending No 3 Municipal Primary School and No 3 Municipal Middle School in Musashino City to the west of Tokyo, Iwashita proceeded first to Tokyo Metropolitan Musashi High School then Myōjō Gakuen High School before entering the Arts Faculty of Seijo University, which she left before taking a degree.

Career
In a career lasting (so far) 60 years, Iwashita has appeared in some 40 TV productions (1958-2014) and about 100 films (1960-2003). She made her TV debut in 1958 in the daytime drama serial Basu-dōri ura （バス通り裏: Just Off the Main Street）. Her first film role was in Keisuke Kinoshita's 1960 The River Fuefuki （笛吹川: Fuefukigawa）. She remained with the production company Shōchiku from then until 1976. Also in 1960, she had the small part of a young woman at a reception desk in Yasujirō Ozu's Late Autumn （秋日和: Akibiyori）. Ozu again cast her as Chishū Ryū's daughter Michiko in the 1962 An Autumn Afternoon, his last film (he died shortly after completing it). According to the critic Nobuo Chiba, Ozu had Iwashita in mind for a role in the film he was preparing at the time of his death, Radishes and Carrots （大根と人参: Daikon to ninjin）(Nobuo Chiba, Ozu Yasujirō and the 20th Century: 千葉信夫,「小津安二郎と２０世紀」, p. 337) In an article in the 12 October 2011 edition of the weekly magazine Shūkan Shinchō（週刊新潮）, Iwashita was quoted as saying that whenever she is abroad she is still very frequently asked about Ozu. In 1986, she starred in Gokudō no onnatachi  （極道の妻たち: Yakuza Wives）, which turned out to be the first in a series of (so far) 16 immensely popular films. (Up to 2013: Iwashita has not appeared in all of them.)

Iwashita has appeared in a large number of commercials for a variety of products. For many years she was the face of the Nippon Menard Cosmetic Company.
Iwashita has been married to the director Masahiro Shinoda since 1967.

Selected filmography

Film

Television

Stage 
On stage, Iwashita played Desdemona to the Othello of Keita Asari  (浅利慶太) .

Honours 
Kinuyo Tanaka Award (1988)
Medal with Purple Ribbon (2004)
Guinness Book of World Records for longest modeling contract (2010)
Order of the Rising Sun, 4th Class, Gold Rays with Rosette (2012)

References

External links

 
 

1941 births
Living people
People from Tokyo
20th-century Japanese actresses
21st-century Japanese actresses
Taiga drama lead actors
Recipients of the Medal with Purple Ribbon
Recipients of the Order of the Rising Sun, 4th class